Xavier Philippe (born 22 November 1980) is a French rower. He competed in the men's quadruple sculls event at the 2004 Summer Olympics.

References

External links
 

1980 births
Living people
French male rowers
Olympic rowers of France
Rowers at the 2004 Summer Olympics
Sportspeople from Amiens